Joseph Burnett (1820–1894) was an American educator and businessman.

Biography
Burnett was born in Southborough, Massachusetts in November 1820 and died there in 1894. He was an innovator in the production of premium vanilla extract in the United States. Vanilla extract was previously imported from France and made by processes which were proprietary secrets. Burnett was also a manufacturer of pharmacy and foods and the family remained in business for over a century. He was the founder of St. Mark's School, an Episcopalian boarding school. He and his wife had twelve children many of whom who married members of other prominent Boston families. His son Edward Burnett served a term as a United States congressman. Edward's wife was Mabel Lowell, the daughter of American writer and diplomat James Russell Lowell, who inherited her father's house Elmwood, currently home to the President of Harvard University. The children born to Joseph Burnetts wife were Edward, Harry, Robert Manton, Waldo, Esther, Ruth, Charles Cutler, John Torrey, Louise and Elinor.

References 
 The Life and Legacy of Joseph Burnett 
 Joseph Burnett Family History descendants 
 History of Joseph Burnett & Company

1820 births
1894 deaths
Schoolteachers from Massachusetts
19th-century American Episcopalians
Founders of schools in the United States
Heads of American boarding schools
People from Southborough, Massachusetts
19th-century American educators
19th-century American philanthropists